Mixed Up Everything is an Australian rock band from Melbourne, Australia. The lineup consists of four brothers: Todd, Blake, Koby, and Kevin Dhima. The band has over 100 million views on YouTube. They released their first studio album Ex-Nihilo on 14 December 2017.  Their second album I Choose was released on 30 July 2021.

Career 
The band of brothers became famous from their videos on YouTube. By July 2020, 55,277,711 views on their YouTube channel. The YouTube performances have caught the attention of major rock bands The Scorpions, the Foo Fighters, and The Offspring. In 2017 the band recorded their first studio album, Ex-Nihilo. Since 2014, the band of brothers has made up to $300 a day busking in the streets of Australia and Europe.

The band began touring Europe in 2018. Near the end of their 18 months on the road touring, the band became stranded in Albania, when the COVID-19 pandemic hit. Albania closed its borders and the band had no choice but to stay. They later performed as an interval act at Festivali i Këngës 59.

Members
Todd Dhima: lead vocals, guitar
Blake Dhima: guitar
Koby Dhima: bass guitar, backing vocals
Kevin Dhima: drums

Discography

Studio albums

Singles

Music videos

References

External links
 
 
 

Musical quartets
Sibling quartets
Australian rock music groups
Musical groups established in 2012
Musical groups from Melbourne
2012 establishments in Australia